Nicolas Vaude (born 24 July 1962) is a French actor.

Filmography

Theater

External links 
 

1962 births
Living people
French male film actors
French male stage actors
French male television actors